Łosie  (Losia) is a village in the administrative district of Gmina Ropa, within Gorlice County, Lesser Poland Voivodeship, in southern Poland.

The village has a population of 770.

References

Villages in Gorlice County